The 2003–04 Honduran Liga Nacional de Ascenso was the 37th season of the Second level in Honduran football and the second one under the name Liga Nacional de Ascenso.  Under the management of Carlos Padilla, F.C. Municipal Valencia won the tournament after defeating Hispano in the final series and obtained promotion to the 2004–05 Honduran Liga Nacional.

Postseason

Quarterfinals

 Municipal Valencia won 2–1 on aggregated.

 Atlético Independiente 2–2 América Marathón on aggregated.  Atlético Independiente won 4–3 on penalty shoot-outs.

 Atlético Esperanzano won 2–1 on aggregated.

 Hispano won 3–2 on aggregated.

Semifinals

 Atlético Esperanzano 2–2 Hispano on aggregated.  Hispano won 3–1 on penalty shoot-outs.

 Municipal Valencia won 3–1 on aggregated.

Final

 Municipal Valencia won 2–0 on aggregated.

References

Ascenso
2003